The Kyle Railroad  is a regional railroad line that runs from North Central Kansas into Eastern Colorado.  It is based in Phillipsburg, Kansas and runs on  track, mostly the former Rock Island Railroad Chicago to Denver main line.  The Kyle was owned by RailAmerica from 2002 to 2012. Genesee & Wyoming Inc. bought RailAmerica in late 2012.

History
The Kyle Railroad was formed for the 1982 northern Kansas harvest season by the Willis B. Kyle Organization, which consisted of several railroad properties, including the San Diego and Arizona Eastern Railway, the Oregon, Pacific and Eastern Railway, the Cumbres and Toltec Scenic Railroad and the Pend Oreille Valley Railroad.
The Kyle Railroad acted as the MSPA's operator of these lines.

In 2009 the Kyle Railroad bought the tracks on which it operates from the MSPA.

Power for the trains initially consisted of former Burlington Northern Railroad ALCO Century 425s, most tracing their heritage to the Spokane, Portland and Seattle Railway.  Kyle Railroad migrated to General Electric U30C and U33C power by the mid-2000s.  After RailAmerica purchased Kyle, the legacy GE power was dropped in favor of EMD power, including former Burlington Northern SD40-2s and Southern Pacific SD40T-2s. The railroad also used to have an ex-Southern Pacific EMD SD45T-2, # 9362. With the purchase by Genesee and Wyoming, a number of MK5000C's provided by the Utah Railway (a fellow subsidiary of Genessee & Wyoming) now operate on the Kyle Railroad.

Traffic
The railroad handles mostly agricultural commodities, although limited amounts of construction materials are carried.  KYLE transported around 20,000 carloads in 2000.

References

Notes

External links

 Kyle Railroad official webpage - Genesee and Wyoming website

Colorado railroads
Kansas railroads
Regional railroads in the United States
RailAmerica
Spin-offs of the Chicago, Rock Island and Pacific Railroad